A list of films produced in the Soviet Union in 1964 (see 1964 in film).

1964

References

External links
 Soviet films of 1964 at the Internet Movie Database

1964
Lists of 1964 films by country or language
Films